Sita Ram Goel (16 October 1921 – 3 December 2003) was an Indian historian, religious and political activist, writer, and publisher in the late twentieth century. He had Marxist leanings during the 1940s, but later became an outspoken anti-communist and also wrote extensively on the damage to Indian culture and heritage wrought by expansionist Islam and missionary activities of Christianity. In his later career he emerged as a commentator on Indian politics, and adhered to Hindu nationalism.

Life

Early life
Sita Ram Goel was born to a Hindu family in Punjab, in 1921; though his childhood was spent in Calcutta. The family looked upon Sri Garibdas, a nirguna saint comparable to Kabir and Nanak, as its patron saint and his verses, "Granth Saheb", were often recited at their home.

Goel graduated in history from the University of Delhi in 1944. As a student, he was a social activist and worked for a Harijan Ashram in his village. His sympathies for the Arya Samaj, the Harijans and the Indian freedom movement, along with his strong support for Mahatma Gandhi, brought him into conflict with many people in his village; Goel also learned to speak and write Sanskrit during these college days.

Direct Action Day
On 16 August 1946, during the Direct Action Day riots in Calcutta that were instigated by the Muslim League shortly before Partition of India, Goel, his wife and their eldest son narrowly escaped with their lives. In his autobiography, How I became a Hindu, Goel writes that he "would have been killed by a Muslim mob" but his fluent Urdu and his Western dress saved him. He further relates, that the next evening they "had to vacate that house and scale a wall at the back to escape murderous Muslim mobs advancing with firearms." He subsequently wrote and circulated a lengthy article on the riots, titled "The Devil Dance in Calcutta", in which he held Hindus and Muslims equally responsible for the tragedy. His friend Ram Swarup, however, criticised him for equating Muslim violence with Hindu violence, claiming that Muslim violence was "aggressive and committed in the furtherance of a very reactionary and retrograde cause, namely the vivisection of India".

Communism to anti-communism
In mid-1940s Goel met members of the CSP (Congress Socialist Party), translated writings by Narendra Deva and Jayaprakash Narayan into English, and was offered a position as an editor of a CSP publication. But his first editorial for the weekly was deemed to be pro-communist, and he had to stop writing for the weekly.

Sita Ram Goel had developed a strong Marxist leaning during his student days and was on the verge of joining the Communist Party of India in 1948. The Communist Party, however, was banned in Bengal on the day he planned to officially become its member. He read Karl Marx's Communist Manifesto and Das Kapital, Harold Laski's "Communism", and "came to the conclusion that while Marx stood for a harmonised social system, Sri Aurobindo held the key to a harmonised human personality." Later, books by Aldous Huxley, Victor Kravchenko, and Suzanne Labin ("Stalin's Russia") convinced him to abandon communism. Subsequently, he wrote many books critical of communism in Calcutta, and worked for the anti-communist "Society for the Defence of Freedom in Asia" (SDFA). According to Goel, when he wanted to apply for a passport in 1955, he was told that his case was receiving attention from the Prime Minister himself, and his application was not granted.

'Nehruism' and censorship
Goel wrote regularly for the "Organiser" weekly, whose editor K. R. Malkani was his friend. In 1961–1962 he used the pseudonym Ekaki (solitary) while writing the series In Defence of Comrade Krishna Menon, critical of Indian National Congress leader Jawaharlal Nehru. Although the series was widely read and praised, he was later admonished by a leader of the Rashtriya Swayamsevak Sangh (RSS) for being too focused on Nehru, and the series was discontinued. The collected series was published in December 1963 by Vaidya Gurudatta  and an updated version released as Genesis and Growth of Nehruism  thirty years later. However Goel's writings about Nehru in the Organiser cost him his job and disillusioned him of the RSS.

According to Goel, he was under surveillance by the Indian government during the 1962 Sino-Indian War. He was not arrested, even though this was according to him demanded by some government leaders, including future Prime Minister I. K. Gujral. In November 1962, he was recruited to participate in a guerrilla war against communist China, but he refused, saying "that so long as Pandit Nehru was the Prime Minister of the country, I could be only a traitor to it."

During the 1980s, Goel worked on a series titled Muslim Separatism: Causes and Consequences, but some passages from his articles were censored by the Organiser. He discovered that his series was considered too controversial by the RSS leadership who thought that it was alienating Muslims from the party, and Goel had to stop writing for the Organiser after the completion of the series Perversion of India's Political Parlance. K.R. Malkani, who was the editor for the Organiser for three decades, was sacked because of his support for Goel. Goel also noted that on other occasions that some of his articles, e.g. his article on the Vedapuri Iswaran Temple controversy, were suppressed in the Indian media.

Publisher and writer
Goel founded the publishing house Biblia Impex India (Aditya Prakashan) in 1963, which published books by authors such as Dharampal, Ram Swarup, K. D. Sethna and K.R. Malkani. Sita Ram Goel joined the non-profit publishing house Voice of India in 1982. Voice of India was founded in 1982 by Ram Swarup, and published works by Harsh Narain, A.K. Chatterjee, K.S. Lal, Koenraad Elst, Rajendra Singh, Sant R.S. Nirala, and Shrikant Talageri among others .

Early versions of several of Goel's books were previously published as a series in periodicals like Hinduism Today, Indian Express or the Organiser. Goel speculates that a series of articles he published in Indian Express in 1989 regarding the destruction of Hindu temples by Muslims may have contributed to the firing of its editor, Arun Shourie, the following year. In August 1990, while releasing two books published by Voice of India, Bharatiya Janta Party leader L. K. Advani chided Goel for using "strong language".

Goel also worked as a part-time secretary for the All India Panchayat Parishad whose manager was his friend Jayaprakash Narayan. Narayan was impressed by Goel's Hindi book Samyak Sambuddha and said to Goel, "If Sanatana Dharma is what you say it is, I am all for it. You can count me as a Sanatanist from today. You can say to whomsoever you please that JP has become a Sanatanist."

Goel was fluent in Hindi, Urdu, Bengali, English and Sanskrit, and read Persian.

Opinions

On rewriting of history books
Goel claimed that there was a systematic distortion of India's history which the Marxist historians of Aligarh and the JNU had undertaken. In particular, he claims that the history of medieval India and the Islamic invasions is being rewritten. He described it as an "experiment with Untruth" and an exercise in suppressio veri suggestio falsi. According to him, the Ministry of Education has extended this experiment to school-level text-books of history. Goel called it "an insidious attempt at thought-control and brainwashing" and argued that the NCERT guidelines are "recommendations for telling lies to our children, or for not telling to them the truth at all."

On Indian secularism
Goel has criticised Indian secularism, alleging that "this concept of Secularism is a gross perversion of the concept which arose in the modern West as a revolt against Christianity and which should mean, in the Indian context, a revolt against Islam as well."

On media bias
Goel claimed that there is a media bias in India, in particular with regard to criticism of Islam or people like Nehru. In 1955 Goel asked one of his friends, who was supportive of Nehru and who had published in many international and national journals, to write an article critical of Nehru's policies. But the Indian publications didn't accept his critical article, and he claims that his standing as a scholar in India suffered thereby.

Goel described an incident during a seminar on "Hurdles To Secularism" in 1963 which Goel attended, and which was presided over by Jayaprakash Narayan. As Goel tells it, most participants in the seminar criticised only "Hindu communalism." But when one Muslim speaker took up the issue of Muslim communalism, he was shouted down by the other Muslims of the seminar, and had to stop talking.

On Indian nationalist organisations
Goel criticised Hindu nationalist organisations like the RSS. He claimed that with few exceptions they "shared the Nehruvian consensus on all important issues", and that "the RSS and the BJS stalwarts spent almost all their time and energy in proving that they were not Hindu communalists but honest secularists." He also claimed that RSS members are worried almost only about the reputation of their organisation and their leaders,  and are rather ignorant to Hindu causes. When a Bharatiya Jana Sangh (BJS) leader asked him to write a book about the BJS, Goel replied that his book "would be pretty critical on the score of their policies."

Goel edited the book "Time for Stock-Taking", a collection of papers critical of the RSS. According to Belgian writer Koenraad Elst, Ram Swarup and Sita Ram Goel wrote in defence of Hinduism, never of "Hindutva".

On Christianity
Goel was outspoken in his criticism of Christianity. He was critical of missionaries' attempts to indigenize Christianity by adopting aspects of Hinduism, particularly as they have also demonized it, in attempts to gain new followers. Goel also held the belief that Jesus was the intellectual author behind Western imperialism and the Holocaust, as he was "no more than an artifice for legitimizing wanton imperialist aggression. He does not symbolize spiritual power or moral uprightness."

He made his case based on the gospels, which he thought cast too dark a shadow on unconverted Jews (see for instance ). From there he drew parallels between Jesus and Adolf Hitler, the latter of whom was, in Goel's words, the first to "completely grasp the verdict passed on the Jews by the Jesus of the gospels".

Goel also ridiculed what he termed "the cult of the disentangled Christ", whereby Christian revisionism attempts to salvage the figure of Jesus from the atrocious historical outcomes he inspired — and only from the bad ones — as though missionary proselytism and Western expansionism were to be perceived in the separate as mere coincidence.

He wrote several works on the topic of Christianity and in 1995, sent Pat Robertson his book Jesus Christ: An Artifice for Aggression, and a letter in protest to Robertson's remarks towards the religion of Hinduism. 

Goel received criticism for his works and standpoints on Christianity. Goel specifically responded to related criticism and reaffirm his stance and viewpoints towards Christianity.

On Islam and Muslims
Goel has criticised the history and doctrines of Islam in some of his writings. His works are also cited by critics of Islam like Robert Spencer and Arun Shourie.

Despite his criticism of Islam, he said that he is not opposed "to an understanding and reconciliation between the two communities. All I want to say is that no significant synthesis or assimilation took place in the past, and history should not be distorted and falsified to serve the political purposes of a Hindu-baiting herd." He argues that the Muslims should evaluate the Islamic history and doctrines in terms of rationalism and humanism "without resort to the casuistry marshalled by the mullahs and sufis, or the apologetics propped up by the Aligarh and Stalinist schools of historians", just as the European Christians did centuries earlier with Christianity.

He believed that the "average Muslim is as good or bad a human being as an average Hindu", and warned:
Some people are prone to confuse Islam with its victims, that is, the Muslims, and condemn the latter at the same time as they come to know the crudities of the former. This is a very serious confusion, which should be avoided by all those who believe in building up a broad-based human brotherhood as opposed to narrow, sectarian, self-centred, and chauvinistic nationalism or communalism.

On decline of Buddhism
Arun Shourie wrote about Goel:
"Marxists cite only two other instances of Hindus having destroyed Buddhist temples. These too it turns out yield to completely contrary explanations. Again Marxists have been asked repeatedly to explain the construction they have been circulating -- to no avail. Equally important, Sita Ram Goel invited them to cite any Hindu text which orders Hindus to break the places of worship of other religions -- as the Bible does, as a pile of Islamic manuals does. He has asked them to name a single person who has been honoured by the Hindus because he broke such places -– the way Islamic historians and lore have glorified every Muslim ruler and invader who did so. A snooty silence has been the only response ".

Literary influences
He wrote and published books in English and Hindi. He also translated George Orwell's 1984, three Dialogues of Plato, Denis Kincaid's The Great Rebel (about Shivaji) and other books into Hindi.

Goel was well-read in Western and Eastern literature, and among his most favourite writers or works were Thomas Hardy, Shakespeare's Hamlet, Bankim Chandra Chattopadhyay, Aldous Huxley, Plato, Tagore, Bibhuti Bhushan Bandopadhyay, Vaishnava and Baul poets, the Kathamrita written by Mahendranath Gupta (Sri M.) and Thomas Gray's poem "Elegy"Thomas Gray Archive : Texts : Poems : Elegy Written in a Country Churchyard. His favourite book was the Hindu epic Mahabharata, which he would read in its original language Sanskrit.

Sita Ram Goel was influenced by Indian writer and philosopher Ram Swarup. He said that his masters have been "Vyasa, Buddha and Sri Aurobindo, as elucidated by Ram Swarup." He was also influenced by Bal Gangadhar Tilak, Dayananda Sarasvati and Mahatma Gandhi.

Banned books

Understanding Islam through Hadis

In 1983, Goel reprinted Ram Swarup's Understanding Islam through Hadis. The book was a summary of the Sahih Muslim Hadith and consisted of extracts from the Hadiths. In 1987, he again reprinted the book, but the copies of a Hindi translation were seized by the police and Goel was arrested briefly.

In due course, some Muslims and the Jamaat-e-Islami weekly Radiance claimed that the book was offensive. In 1990, the Hindi translation of the book was banned. In March 1991, the English original was banned as well. The "criminal case" against Goel for printing the book was dismissed after some years on 5 May 1997, but the book still remains banned.

Indian intellectuals protested against the arrest of Goel. Arun Shourie commented on the criminal case:

No one has ever refuted him on facts, but many have sought to smear him and his writing. They have thereby transmuted the work from mere scholarship into warning. (...)The forfeiture is exactly the sort of thing which had landed us where we are: where intellectual inquiry is shut out; where our traditions are not examined, and reassessed; and where as a consequence there is no dialogue. It is exactly the sort of thing too which foments reaction. (...)"Freedom of expression which is legitimate and constitutionally protected," it [the Supreme Court] declared last year, "cannot be held to ransom by an intolerant group or people."

Hindu View of Christianity and Islam (1993)
In 1993 the MP Syed Shahabuddin, who in 1988 asked for the ban on The Satanic Verses, demanded a ban on Ram Swarup's book Hindu View of Christianity and Islam. Goel and Swarup went into hiding because they feared that they could get arrested. The court accepted a bail and the authors came out of hiding. Arun Shourie and K. S. Lal protested against the ban.

Colin Maine's The Dead Hand of Islam
In 1986, Goel reprinted Colin Maine's essay The Dead Hand of Islam . Some Muslims filed a criminal case against Goel, alleging that it violated Sections 153A and 295A of the Indian Penal Code and similar articles of the Indian Customs Act.

The judge discharged Goel and referred to the earlier court precedent "1983 CrLJ 1446". Speaking of the importance of that precedent, the judge in his discussion said: "If such a contention is accepted a day will come when that part of history which is unpalatable to a particular religion will have to be kept in cold storage on the pretext that the publication of such history would constitute an offence punishable under Sec. 153A of the Penal Code. The scope of S-153A cannot be enlarged to such an extent with a view to thwart history. (...) Otherwise, the position will be very precarious. A nation will have to forget its own history and in due course the nation will have no history at all. (...) If anybody intends to extinguish the history (by prohibiting its publication) of the nation on the pretext of taking action under the above sections, his act will have to be treated as malafide one."

The Calcutta Quran Petition
Goel published The Calcutta Quran Petition with Chandmal Chopra in 1986. On 31 August 1987, Chopra was arrested by the police and kept in custody until 8 September for publishing the book with Goel. Goel absconded to avoid arrest.

Hindu Temples – What Happened to Them
There were proposals in November 1990 in Uttar Pradesh to ban Goel's book Hindu Temples - What Happened to Them.

Legacy
Sita Ram Goel has been described by Koenraad Elst as an "intellectual kshatriya". David Frawley said about Goel that he was "modern India's greatest intellectual kshatriya", and "one of India's most important thinkers in the post-independence era". According to Frawley, "Sitaram followed a strong rationalistic point of view that did not compromise the truth even for politeness sake. His intellectual rigor is quite unparalleled in Hindu circles..."

Books and booklets

English
Author
 The China debate; whom shall we believe?, Calcutta: Society for Defence of Freedom in Asia, 1953, 50 p.
 Mind Murder in Mao-land, Calcutta: Society for Defence of Freedom in Asia, 1953, 53 p.
 Communist Party in China: a study in treason., Calcutta: Society for Defence of Freedom in Asia, 1953, 106 p.
 China is red with peasants' blood, Calcutta: Society for Defence of Freedom in Asia, 1953, 92 p.
 CPI conspires for civil-war: analysis of a secret document, Calcutta: Society for Defence of Freedom in Asia, 1953, 56 p.
 Red brother or yellow slave ?, Calcutta: Society for Defence of Freedom in Asia, 1953, 82 p.
 Nehru's fatal friendship, New Delhi: Society for Defence of Freedom in Asia, 1955, 29 p.
 Netaji and the CPI, Calcutta: Society for Defence of Freedom in Asia, 1955, 72 p.
 In defence of Comrade Krishna Menon : a political biography of Pandit Nehru, New Delhi: Bharati Sahitya Sadan, 1963, 272 p. A reprint with changes would appear in 1993 as the Volume I of Genesis and growth of Nehruism.
 Hindu society under siege, New Delhi: Voice of India, 1981, 48 p. A revised edition released in 1994.
 How I Became a Hindu, New Delhi: Voice of India, 1982, 67 p. A third enlarged edition would appear in 1993, 106 p.
 The Story of Islamic Imperialism in India, New Delhi: Voice of India, 1982, 126 p. A second enlarged edition would appear in 1994, 138 p.
 Defence of Hindu Society, New Delhi: Voice of India, 1983, 96 p. A second edition would appear in 1987 and a third enlarged one in 1994, 118 p.
 Muslim separatism : causes and consequences, New Delhi: Voice of India, 1983, 123 p. A second revised edition will appear in 1995, 128 p.
 Perversion of India's political parlance, New Delhi: Voice of India, 1984, 60 p.
 History of heroic Hindu resistance to Muslim invaders, 636 AD to 1206 AD, New Delhi: Voice of India, 1984, 48 p. Another edition would be released in 1994, 58 p.
 The emerging national vision, New Delhi: Voice of India, 1984, 15 p.
 St. Francis Xavier : the man and his mission, New Delhi: Voice of India, 1985, 16 p.
 Papacy, its doctrines and history, New Delhi: Voice of India, 1986, 118 p.
 Catholic Ashrams : adopting and adapting Hindu dharma, New Delhi: Voice of India, 1988, 100 p.
 History of Hindu–Christian Encounters, AD 304 to 1996, New Delhi: Voice of India, 1989, 405 p. A second revised and enlarged edition would appear in 1996, 530 p.
 Hindus and Hinduism : Manipulation of meanings, New Delhi: Voice of India, 1993, 24 p.
 Islam vis-a-vis Hindu temples, New Delhi: Voice of India, 1993, 66 p. 
 Genesis and growth of Nehruism. vol. 1, Commitment to Communism, New Delhi: Voice of India, 1993, 231 p. Reprint with changes of the 1963 book In defence of Comrade Krishna Menon.
 Stalinist "historians" spread the big lie, New Delhi: Voice of India, 1993, 38 p.
 Jesus Christ : an artifice for aggression, New Delhi: Voice of India, 1994, 114 p.

Editor
 Hindu temples, what happened to them : Vol. I, A preliminary survey, New Delhi: Voice of India, 1990, 191 p. With Arun Shourie et al. Volume II would be released in 1993, 440 p.
 Freedom of expression : secular theocracy versus liberal democracy, New Delhi: Voice of India, 1998, 179 p. Mostly articles.
 Time for stock taking, whither Sangh Parivar?, New Delhi: Voice of India, 1997, 468 p. Criticisms of the BJP and RSS, including their responses.
 Vindicated by Time: the Niyogi Committee report on Christian missionary activities, New Delhi: Voice of India, 1998, 1006 p. A reprint, with an introduction by Goel, of the official report on the missionaries' methods of subversion and conversion, from 1956.

Prefaces, introductions or commentaries
 Introduction to Joseph Stalin's World Conquest in Instalments, Calcutta: Society for Defence of Freedom in Asia, 1952, 56 p.
 Commentary of Mao Zedong's The conquest of China, Calcutta: Society for Defence of Freedom in Asia, 1954, 276 p.
 Preface to Chandmal Chopra's The Calcutta Quran Petition, New Delhi: Voice of India, 1986, 71 p. A third revised and enlarged edition would appear in 1999, with more writing by Goel, 325 p.
 Preface to Tipu Sultan: Villain Or Hero? : an Anthology, New Delhi: Voice of India, 1993, 85 p.
 Preface to the reprint of Mathilda Joslyn Gage's Woman, Church and State (1997, ca. 1880). A feminist critique of Christianity.

Hindi
Author
 Pathabhṛshṭa, 1960.
 Saikyularijma : deśadroha kā dūsrā nāma, 1983.Yashpal Sharma would translate it into English as India's secularism, new name for national subversion, New Delhi: Voice of India, 1999, 107 p.
 Udīyamāna raṣṭra-dṛṣṭi, 1983.
 Hindū samāja : saṅkeṭoṃ ke ghere meṃ, 1988.
 Saptaśīla, 1999.

Translator
 Satyakama Socrates, three dialogues of Plato : (Apology, Crito and Phaedo))
 Victor Kravchenko's I Chose Freedom
 Thomas Gray's poem Elegy.
 Bankim Chandra Chattopadhyay's Ramayaner Alochona
 The God that Failed, a testimony on Communism by Arthur Koestler, André Gide and others.
 Ram Swarup's Communism and Peasantry
 George Orwell's Nineteen Eighty-Four
 Shaktiputra Shivaji, Denis Kincaid's The Grand Rebel
 Panchjanya, Taslima Nasrin's Lajja

Further reading
 India's only communalist: In commemoration of Sita Ram Goel; Edited by Koenraad Elst; Voice of India, New Delhi. (2005)  (With contributions by Subhash Kak, David Frawley, Lokesh Chandra, Shrikant Talageri, Vishal Agarwal, N.S. Rajaram and others.) Contentious issues on religion and temples to be decided by court: BJP President J P Nadda
 Elst, Koenraad. India's Only Communalist: an Introduction to the Work of Sita Ram Goel. In "Hinduism and Secularism: After Ayodhya", Arvind Sharma (ed.) Palgrave 2001

See also
 Ram Swarup
 Koenraad Elst
 Robert Spencer
 Ibn Warraq
 Srđa Trifković
 Oriana Fallaci
 Andrew Bostom
 Swapan Dasgupta

Notes

References
 India's only communalist – A short biography of Sita Ram Goel  Koenraad Elst
 Elst, Koenraad, Ayodhya and After: Issues Before Hindu Society (1991)
 Goel, S.R. Freedom of Expression (1998)

External links
 India's only communalist A short biography of Sita Ram Goel  by Koenraad Elst, Leuven (Belgium), 28 May 1999. (pdf)
 Many books of Sita Ram Goel online 

1921 births
2003 deaths
Critics of Christianity
Critics of Islam
Indian anti-communists
Indian political writers
Indian publishers (people)
Converts to Hinduism from atheism or agnosticism
Indian Hindus
Islam and politics
Anti-Christian sentiment in Asia
Voice of India writers
Businesspeople from Punjab, India
20th-century Indian businesspeople
Journalists from Punjab, India
Indian male journalists
Hindu nationalists
Anti-Islam sentiment in India